Sir William Curtis, Bt. (25 January 1752 – 18 January 1829) was an English businessman, banker and politician.  Although he had a long political and business career (the two significantly intertwined), he was probably best known for the banquets he hosted.

Life
Born in Wapping, London, Curtis was the son of a sea biscuit manufacturer, Joseph Curtis, and his wife Mary Tennant. The family business was making ship's biscuit and other dry provisions for the Royal Navy. They were also shipowners whose vessels carried convicts to Australia and engaged in South Sea whaling.

A lifelong Tory, he was elected as a Member of Parliament for the City of London at the 1790 general election. He held the seat continuously for 28 years until his defeat at the 1818 general election. He was returned to the Commons in February 1819 at a by-election for Bletchingley, and at the 1820 general election he was returned again for the City of London. He did not contest London again at the 1826 election, when he was returned for Hastings. He resigned that seat later the same year.

Curtis was also Alderman of the city, becoming Sheriff of London in 1788 and Lord Mayor in 1795–96. He was known for the lavish banquets he gave at his estate, Cullands Grove. He was created a Baronet of Cullonds Grove in 1802.

Curtis died in 1829.  His estate sale ran for a week, and included 370 dozen bottles of wine, port, claret, East India Madeira, sherry (Wild's), Malaga, Hock, and beer.

See also
Lady Penrhyn, a ship part-owned by Curtis that carried convicts in the First Fleet to New South Wales in 1788.
Curtis Island, New Zealand, one of the Kermadec Islands named after Curtis by the Lady Penryn.
Butterworth Squadron, a whaling and maritime fur trading expedition to the Pacific Ocean in 1792, of which Curtis was a principal investor.

References

External links 

1752 births
1829 deaths
People from Wapping
Baronets in the Baronetage of the United Kingdom
Sheriffs of the City of London
18th-century lord mayors of London
18th-century English politicians
19th-century English politicians
Tory MPs (pre-1834)
Members of the Parliament of Great Britain for English constituencies
British MPs 1790–1796
British MPs 1796–1800
Members of the Parliament of the United Kingdom for English constituencies
UK MPs 1801–1802
UK MPs 1802–1806
UK MPs 1806–1807
UK MPs 1807–1812
UK MPs 1812–1818
UK MPs 1818–1820
UK MPs 1820–1826
UK MPs 1826–1830
British people in whaling
British slave owners